Begas is a surname. Notable people with the surname include:

 Carl Joseph Begas (1794–1854), German painter; father of Oskar, Reinhold, Adalbert and Karl Begas
 Oskar Begas (1828-1883), Portrait painter and Professor at the Prussian Academy of Arts.
 Reinhold Begas (1831–1911), Sculptor.
 Adalbert Begas (1836-1888) Painter, specializing in genre scenes.
 Karl Begas (1845-1916) Sculptor.